Leo Braudy (born June 11, 1941) is University Professor and Professor of English at the University of Southern California, where he teaches 17th- and 18th-century English literature, film history and criticism, and American culture. He has previously taught at Yale, Columbia, and Johns Hopkins University. He is best known for his cultural studies scholarship on celebrity, masculinity, and film, and is frequently sought after for interviews on popular culture, Hollywood cinema, and the American zeitgeist of the 1950s.

Background
Braudy was born in Philadelphia, Pennsylvania. He is the son of Edward and Zelda (Smith) Braudy; he received his B.A. from Swarthmore College in 1963 and his M.A. 1963 and Ph.D. 1967 from Yale University. He is married to the painter Dorothy McGahee Braudy. They live and work in Los Angeles.

Scholarship
Leo Braudy's books cover topics spanning literature, film, and other art forms, often with an eye toward understanding the impact of history on artistic form and the cultural expression of feelings. His books have been nominated for the National Book Critics Circle Award and have been included among the Los Angeles Times' "Best of the Best Books of the Year" and the New York Times' "Outstanding Books of the Year." He is best known for The Frenzy of Renown: Fame and its History (Oxford, 1986); and From Chivalry to Terrorism: War and the Changing Nature of Masculinity (Knopf, 2003). His most recent book is Haunted: On ghosts, witches, vampires, zombies and other monsters of the natural and supernatural worlds (Yale University Press, 2016).
Each of these works address changing cultural and historical definitions of what otherwise seem to be innate and unchanging emotions and attitudes—the desire for fame, the concept of masculinity, the shape of fear.

Along with Marshall Cohen, he also co-edits the widely used anthology Film Theory and Criticism (Oxford, 8th ed. 2016).

His 2006 book On the Waterfront (British Film Institute) is a study of the namesake film's production, the post-war values it reflects, and the controversy surrounding director Elia Kazan's testimony before the House Unamerican Activities Committee. In 2011, The Hollywood Sign appeared in Yale University Press's American Icons series. It traces the intertwined history of Hollywood and its landmark sign from the founding of the city as a prohibitionist enclave in the 1880s through the beginnings of the movies, the construction of the sign in the 1920s as a real estate advertisement, and the mixed fortunes of both the sign and the film business down to the present.

In a departure from his scholarly work, Braudy published in 2013 a memoir of his life as a teenager entitled Trying to be Cool: Growing Up in the 1950s. Subtitled "based on a true story," the book merges scenes from his life in the decade with observations about rock 'n' roll music, science fiction movies, the domestic Cold War, and other aspects of the period.

In 2016 his book Haunted (Yale) appeared. Subtitled "On ghosts, witches, vampires, zombies, and other monsters of the natural and supernatural world," it traces how fear has been shaped in western culture from the Protestant Reformation to contemporary horror movies.

He received a Guggenheim Fellowship in 1971–72, along with a grant-in-aid from the American Council of Learned Societies, and a National Endowment for the Humanities research fellowship in 1979. In 2010 he was elected a fellow of the American Academy of Arts and Sciences. In 2016, he received the honorary degree of Doctor of Humane Letters from Swarthmore College and was inducted into the Hall of Fame of Central High School of Philadelphia, the second oldest continuously public high school in the United States (founded 1836).

Film and television appearances
Braudy frequently appears as a commentator on popular culture, cultural history, and films on a variety of television shows, including Crossfire, World of Wonder, The Maria Shriver Show, and The South Bank Show. A transcript of his interview with Bill Moyers on Moyers's PBS series appeared in The World of Ideas (Doubleday, 1990). He has acted in John Waters' Polyester (1981), and Robert Kramer's underground classic Ice (1970).

Other film appearances include:
 Facing the Past (2005)—Braudy is interviewed in this featurette included in the DVD of Elia Kazan's 1957 film A Face in the Crowd.
 Empire of Dreams: The Story of the 'Star Wars' Trilogy (2004)—This feature-length documentary is included with the 4-Disc Star Wars Trilogy DVD set.
 Mayor of the Sunset Strip (2003)—Braudy comments as an authority on fame in this documentary about the rise and fall of disc jockey Rodney Bingenheimer.
 Our Infatuation with Fame: Leo Braudy (1990)—In this interview, Bill Moyers and Leo Braudy discuss the pleasures and perils of celebrity.

Bibliography
Books:

 Haunted: On ghosts, witches, vampires, zombies, and other monsters of the natural and supernatural worlds, Yale University Press, New Haven, 2016.
 Trying to be Cool: Growing Up in the 1950s, Asahina & Wallace, Los Angeles, 2013.
 The Hollywood Sign: Fantasy and Reality of an American Icon, Yale University Press, New Haven, 2011.
 On the Waterfront, British Film Institute Film Classics, London, 2005.
 From Chivalry to Terrorism: War and the Changing Nature of Masculinity. New York: Knopf, 2003; paperback, 2005.
 Native Informant: Essays on Film, Fiction and Popular Culture. Oxford University Press, 1992.
 The Frenzy of Renown: Fame and Its History. Oxford University Press, 1986; paperback, 1987. Second edition (paperback) with a new Afterword, Vintage, 1997.
 The World in a Frame: What We See in Films. Doubleday, 1976 (paperback, 1977); Second edition (paperback), University of Chicago, 1984; Twenty-fifth anniversary edition, 2002.
 Jean Renoir: The World of his Films. Doubleday, 1972 (paperback, 1973; English edition, 1977); second edition, Columbia University Press, 1989.
 Narrative Form in History and Fiction: Hume, Fielding, and Gibbon. Princeton, 1970; second edition (as The Plot of Time, Los Angeles: Figueroa Press, 2003).

Anthologies edited and co-edited:

 Film Theory and Criticism: Introductory Readings (with Marshall Cohen), eighth edition, New York: Oxford, 2016.
 Film Theory and Criticism: Introductory Readings (with Marshall Cohen), seventh edition. New York: Oxford, 2008.
 Film Theory and Criticism: Introductory Readings (with Marshall Cohen), sixth edition. New York: Oxford, 2004.
 Film Theory and Criticism: Introductory Readings (with Marshall Cohen), fifth edition. New York: Oxford, 1998.
 Film Theory and Criticism: Introductory Readings (with Gerald Mast and Marshall Cohen), fourth edition. New York: Oxford, 1992.
 Great Film Directors: A Critical Anthology (with Morris Dickstein). Oxford, 1979.
 Norman Mailer: A Collection of Critical Essays. Prentice-Hall, 1972.
 Truffaut's Shoot the Piano Player: A Collection of Critical Essays. Prentice-Hall, 1972.

Original Articles and Essays in Books:

 "Dryden, Marvell and the Design of Political Poetry." In Enchanted Ground: Reimagining John Dryden. Toronto: University of Toronto Press, December, 2004.
 Leo Braudy and Robert P. Kolker, "An Interview with Robert Altman." Film Voices: Interviews from Post Script, ed. Gerald Duchovnay. Albany: State University of New York Press, 2004.
 Leo Braudy and Mark Crispin Miller, "An Interview with Sydney Pollack." Film Voices: Interviews from Post Script, ed. Gerald Duchovnay. Albany: State University of New York Press, 2004.
 "Horror," essay for Lexikon Populäre Kultur, ed. Hans-Otto Hűgel. Stuttgart: Metzler Verlag,. 2003
 "Celebrity." In The Encyclopedia of American Studies, 2002.
 "Entertainment: Show Biz Turns Big Biz," in Century of Change: America in Pictures, 1900–2000, ed. Richard B. Stolley. Boston: Little, Brown, 2000.
 "Jean Renoir," American National Biography, eds. John A. Garraty and Mark C. Carnes, 24 vols. Oxford, 1999.
 "The Genre of Nature," Refiguring American Film Genres, ed. Nick Browne. University of California Press, 1998.
 "Afterword: Rethinking Remakes" to Play It Again, Sam: Retakes on Remakes, eds. Andrew Horton and Stuart Y. McDougal. Berkeley: University of California Press. 1998.
 "Unturning the Century: The Missing Decade of the 1690s," Les Fins de Siécle: English Poetry in 1590, 1690, 1790, 1890, 1990, ed. Elaine Scarry. Johns Hopkins University Press, 1994.
 "Varieties of Literary Affection," The Profession of Eighteenth-Century Literature: Reflections on an Institution, ed. Leo Damrosch. University of Wisconsin Press, 1992.
 "An Interview with Leo Braudy" in Bill Moyers, A World of Ideas II. New York: Doubleday, 1990.
 "Sequel," in The International Encyclopedia of Communications, ed. Erik Barnouw. Oxford, 1989.
 "Genre and the Resurrection of the Past," Shadows of the Magic Lamp, ed. George E. Slusser and Eric S. Rabkin. Carbondale: University of Southern Illinois Press, 1985.
 "Succeeding in Language," The State of the Language, eds. Leonard Michaels and Christopher Ricks. University of California, 1980.
 "Realists, Naturalists, and Novelists of Manners," The Harvard Guide to Contemporary American Writing, ed. Daniel Hoffman, Harvard, 1979.
 "Rossellini: From Open City to General della Rovere," Great Film  Directors: A Critical Anthology, eds. Leo Braudy and Morris Dickstein, Oxford, 1979.
 "Penetration and Impenetrability in Clarissa," in New Approaches to Eighteenth-Century Literature, ed. Phillip Harth. Columbia, 1974 (English Institute Essays).

External links
 Leo Braudy's website
 “Paranoia and Patriotism” on Leo Braudy's Blog at The Lear Center
 “The Queen's English” on Leo Braudy's Blog at The Lear Center
 Random House Author Spotlight: Leo Braudy
 Braudy's introduction to the Criterion Collection edition of Ingmar Bergman's The Silence
 Faculty profile, Department of English, University of Southern California
 Profile of Braudy's work on From Chivalry to Terrorism in the USC Trojan Family Magazine
 On Point interview with Tom Ashbrook
 LA Times op-ed, September 2006
 Interview with Connie Martinson
 "Cultural Shaping and Historical Change," video and summary of a talk given at Harvard University in November, 2005 as part of the conference "In the War Zone: How Does Gender Matter?"
 Terence Smith interviews Leo Braudy, Richard Schickel, and Richard Reeves on the public response to John F. Kennedy, Jr.'s death on PBS's Online Newshour
 Arthur Magazine on Robert Kramer's Ice

American academics of English literature
American male non-fiction writers
Writers from California
Film theorists
Literary critics of English
Mass media theorists
Central High School (Philadelphia) alumni
Columbia University faculty
Johns Hopkins University faculty
University of Southern California faculty
Swarthmore College alumni
Yale University alumni
1941 births
Living people